The Krapcho decarboxylation is the chemical reaction of esters with halide anions.  The ester must contain an electron-withdrawing group in the beta position, such as β-ketoesters, malonic esters, α-cyanoesters, or α-sulfonylesters.  It works best with methyl esters, since methyl groups are more susceptible to SN2-reaction than are larger alkyl ester substituents, such as ethyl or propyl groups.  The byproducts of this decarbomethoxylation are chloromethane and CO2. They are lost as gases, which helps drive the reaction. 

The Krapcho decarboxylation is a useful way to manipulate malonic esters because it cleaves only one of the two ester groups. The apparent alternative, base hydrolysis followed by decarboxylation, requires a subsequent step to regenerate the ester.

References

Elimination reactions
Substitution reactions

Name reactions